The Allgemeine Bodencreditanstalt or Boden-Credit-Anstalt (also known as Bodencredit or simply "Boden") was an Austrian bank based in Vienna, created in 1863 and absorbed in 1929 by its main competitor the Creditanstalt following its 1927 acquisition of two smaller troubled banks, Verkehrsbank and Unionbank.

Bodencreditanstalt

It had strong aristocratic connections, and also managed money for the Habsburg family. It was initially involved in mortgage credit, for which it became a dominant provider, and lending to industry and infrastructure projects such as railway construction. Following the Austrian financial crisis of 1873, it had to be rescued by emergency financial assistance from the Imperial government, which it reimbursed in 1875.

From 1899 on, it also developed a significant portfolio of equity stakes in manufacturing businesses, including the textile industry. Unlike other Austrian universal banks, however, it did not develop a branch network. , appointed the Bodencreditanstalt's Governor in 1910, adopted an aggressive stance of rapid expansion and head-on competition with the Rothschild-led Creditanstalt, particularly after the end of World War I. By then, the Bodencreditanstalt had become Austria's second-largest bank after Creditanstalt. J.P. Morgan & Co. acquired a stake in the Bodencreditanstalt in the early 1920s, but withdrew in 1923 following a difference of views with Sieghart. The Bodencreditanstalt subsequently attempted to expand in Central Europe, but soon suffered from difficulties with some of its industrial borrowers, particularly . in October 1929, it became clear that the bank was no longer viable. Austrian Chancellor Johannes Schober intervened forcefully and persuaded Louis Nathaniel de Rothschild that Creditanstalt should purchase its troubled competitor, albeit at a heavily discounted stock price.

Verkehrsbank

The  was established in 1864, initially as a discount bank. It soon developed as a universal bank, with investments in heavy engineering and machinery, paper, sugar, hospitality, and other industries. It was located from inception at Wipplingerstrasse 28 in Vienna, which it had rebuilt in 1880–1883 on a design by architect . It was acquired by the Bodencreditanstalt in 1927, possibly as an intended offset to the acquisition of the much more troubled Unionbank at the same time.

Unionbank

From 1887 it had its head office on Renngasse 1, a former home of the Rothschild family and Creditanstalt. In 1922, it was purchased by financier . It quickly ran into distress, was purchased by Österreichische Postsparkasse in 1926, and on by the Bodencreditanstalt in 1927 simultaneously as the Verkehrsbank.

Mergers and aftermath

The acquisition of Verkehrsbank and Unionbank soon put the Bodencreditanstalt in jeopardy, mostly because of the burden associated with Unionbank. It delayed writing off the bad loans inherited from the two banks it had acquired, but that lack of transparency only compounded the loss of confidence. In October 1929, the Austrian government leaned on Creditanstalt to acquire the ailing Bodencreditanstalt, which in turn was at the root of Creditanstalt's collapse less than two years later, a major development of the European banking crisis of 1931.

Bodencreditanstalt leadership
 Móric Almásy, Governor 1863-1873
 , General Director 1864-1880
 Alois Moser, Governor 1873-1878
 Joseph von Bezecny, Governor 1878-1904
 , member of management 1874–1908, Governor 1908-1909
 Alexander Spitzmüller, General Director 1909-1910
 , Governor 1910-1917
 , Governor 1917-1919
 , Governor 1919-1929

See also
 Anglo-Austrian Bank
 Wiener Bankverein

Notes

Defunct banks of Austria